Quandary was a railway station on the Temora- Roto railway line in New South Wales, Australia.  It opened in 1905 as Beaconsfield  changing its name to Quandary  in 1907 after a large local pastoral holding. A larger timber station building than adjacent stations, and toilet were provided on the  platform.  In 1931, the existing large concrete grain silo opened, and in the 1960s a steel bulkhead storage opened.  CPH passenger rail-motors operated between Temora and Griffith. All facilities were progressively removed from the 1960s, with the closure of the station to passenger services in 1975 and the removal of the station buildings and passing loop in 1985. The grain silos and loading facilities remain, however there is now no trace of the station.

References 

Disused regional railway stations in New South Wales
Railway stations in Australia opened in 1905
Railway stations closed in 1975